The Polish Chamber Philharmonic Orchestra Sopot ( is a chamber orchestra based in Poland. It was founded in 1982 by Wojciech Rajski as the Polish Chamber Philharmonic, and since 1984 has also performed as a full orchestra and carries the name of Polish Chamber Orchestra Sopot. The orchestra's recordings can be heard on the EMI Classics, Dux Records, and Sony Classical labels, among others.

References

External links 
 
 

Polish orchestras